MCBA may refer to:
 Michigan Competing Band Association, Michigan, United States
 Minnesota Center for Book Arts, Minnesota, United States
 Cantonal Museum of Fine Arts (Musée cantonal des beaux-arts), Lausanne, Switzerland